Williston is a historic home and farm complex located near Orange, Orange County, Virginia. It was built in 1867, and is a two-story, three bay, Italianate style brick dwelling. The front facade features a tall portico with paired fluted polygonal columns set on pedestals. The interior features stenciled and painted murals on the dining room walls.  Also on the property are the contributing smokehouse, hen house, servant's house, carriage house, granary and the foundation and lean-to of what was formerly a late-19th century barn.

It was listed on the National Register of Historic Places in 2005.

References

Houses on the National Register of Historic Places in Virginia
Farms on the National Register of Historic Places in Virginia
Italianate architecture in Virginia
Houses completed in 1867
Houses in Orange County, Virginia
National Register of Historic Places in Orange County, Virginia